Savage Entertainment was  an American video game developer founded in 1997 by Tim Morten and Chacko Sonny.

History
Savage Entertainment was founded in 1997 by Tim Morten and Chacko Sonny.  They have handled multiple ports of games, and have also developed full titles independently.  Savage has also created simulators for various branches of the US government, including the Army, the Department of Homeland Security, and the Defense Advanced Research Projects Agency (DARPA).  One of their titles, Star Wars: Battlefront II (PSP), placed in the top 20 in sales according to the NPD Group for 2005.

Games developed
James Bond 007: Agent Under Fire (Xbox) (2002)
James Bond 007: Nightfire (created two driving levels) (2002)
He-Man: Defender of Grayskull (PlayStation 2) (2005)
Star Wars: Battlefront II (PSP) (2005)
Scooby-Doo! Who's Watching Who? (PSP) (2006)
Medal of Honor: Vanguard (PS2) (2007)
Transformers: The Game (PSP) (2007)
Wall-E (PSP) (2007)
Rock Revolution (PlayStation 3) (2008)
Transformers: Revenge of the Fallen (PSP) (2009)
Marvel: Ultimate Alliance 2 (PSP) (2009)

Cancelled games
Jurassic Park: Survival
He-Man: Defender of Grayskull (GameCube and Xbox ports)
Destroy All Humans! Big Willy Unleashed (PS2 and PSP ports)
Saints Row: Undercover (PSP)

References

External links

Companies based in Los Angeles
Video game companies established in 1997
Video game companies disestablished in 2011
Defunct video game companies of the United States
Video game development companies